Albert Montañés Roca (born 26 November 1980) is a retired professional tennis player from Spain.

He first entered the top 100 in 2001. He achieved a career-high singles ranking of world No. 22 in 2010 and has won six singles titles and two doubles titles.

Montañés is one of the very few players to win a title after saving match points in two different matches. He did it during his title run in Estoril 2009 in his quarter-finals and the final.

He holds the record for most first-round exits at Grand Slam events; 35 reached at 2016 Wimbledon, beating Kenneth Carlsen's long standing record of 30 first-round exits.

His career ended at the 2017 Barcelona Open. He was awarded a wild card to participate in the event and reached the second round, where he lost to fellow countryman Feliciano López 6–2, 6–2.

ATP career finals

Singles: 11 (6 titles, 5 runner-ups)

Doubles: 6 (2 titles, 4 runner-ups)

Performance timelines

Singles 

1 Held as Hamburg Masters (outdoor clay) until 2008, Madrid Masters (outdoor clay) 2009–present.
2 Held as Stuttgart Masters (indoor hard) until 2001, Madrid Masters (indoor hard) from 2002–08, and Shanghai Masters (outdoor hard) 2009–present.

Doubles

Top 10 Wins per season

Wins over Top 10s per season

Notes

References

External links 

 
 

1980 births
Living people
People from Montsià
Sportspeople from the Province of Tarragona
Tennis players from Catalonia
Spanish male tennis players
Tennis players from Barcelona
21st-century Spanish people